EMBA may refer to:

 Executive Master of Business Administration, education degree
 EMBA Mink Breeders Association, US
 EMBA council